Roodeplaat Research Laboratories (RRL) was a front company established in 1983 by the South African Defence Force to research, test and produce biological weapons within a covert operation known as Project Coast.

The Agricultural Research Council - Plant Protection Research Institute is now situated on this location.

Other SADF front organisations
 Badger Arms
 Biocon (South Africa)
 Civil Cooperation Bureau
 Delta G Scientific Company
 Electronic Magnetic Logistical Component
 Geo International Trading
 Infladel
 Jeugkrag
 Lema (company)
 Military Technical Services
 Protechnik
 Veterans for Victory

References

1983 establishments in South Africa
Defence companies of South Africa
Biological warfare facilities
Companies established in 1983
Research institutes in South Africa